Shelbyville Independent School District is a public school district based in the community of Shelbyville, Texas (USA).  The district is located in southeastern Shelby County and includes part of Huxley. A small portion of northwestern Sabine County is served by the district.  In 2009, the school district was rated "academically acceptable" by the Texas Education Agency.

Campuses
Shelbyville ISD has three campuses - 
Shelbyville High School
Shelbyville Middle School 
Shelbyville Elementary School

References

External links
Shelbyville ISD

School districts in Shelby County, Texas
School districts in Sabine County, Texas